Pakistan has some of the highest values of insolation in the world, with eight to nine hours of sunshine per day, ideal climatic conditions for solar power generation.
However, the country has been slow to adopt the technology. Electricity tariff in Pakistan is one of highest in the world, despite this as of 2022, total solar power energy of Pakistan is only 568 MWAC.

The country has solar plants in Pakistani Kashmir, Punjab, Sindh and Balochistan. 
Initiatives are under development by the International Renewable Energy Agency, the Japan International Cooperation Agency, Chinese companies, and Pakistani private sector energy companies. 
The country aims to build the Quaid-e-Azam Solar Power Park (QASP) in the Cholistan Desert, Punjab, by 2017 with a 1 GW capacity. 
A plant of this size would be enough to power around 320,000 homes.

Projects 
Beaconhouse installed the first high quality integrated solar energy system with a 10 kW power generation capacity capable of grid tie-in at Beaconhouse Canal Side Campus, Lahore. It was a pilot project for BSS designed by U.S. consultants, based upon feasibility by the U.S. Trade and Development Agency (USTDA).

50 to 100 MW of photovoltaics is expected to be installed in 2013, and at least 300 MW in 2014. In May 2015, 100 MW of a planned 1,000 MW were installed in the Quaid-e-Azam Solar Park.

The progress of net metering in Pakistan up to 31 October 2021 is 268.69 MW commissioned systems.

Annual solar irradiation 
Solar irradiance in Pakistan is 5.3 kWh/m2/day. Pakistan has set a highly ambitious target to add approximately 4 GWAC of renewable capacity by 2030 in addition to replacing 5% diesel with biodiesel by 2015 and 10% by 2025.

Government policy 
Raja Pervaiz Ashraf, the Federal Minister of Water & Power announced on 2 July 2009 that 7,000 villages would be electrified using solar energy by 2014. Senior adviser Sardar Zulfiqar Khosa stated that the Punjab government would begin new projects aimed at power production through coal, solar energy and wind power; this would generate additional resources.

The Government of Pakistan allowed the provincial government of Sindh to conduct feasibility research. The government planned to install a desalination plant powered by solar energy.

On 21 May 2022, Prime Minister Shehbaz Sharif announced removal of 17 per cent general sales tax on solar panels.

See also 
Renewable energy in developing countries
Renewable energy in Pakistan
Wind power in Pakistan
International Solar Alliance

References